First Fork South Fork Piney River is a tributary of the South Fork Piney River in Eagle County, Colorado.  The river flows northeast from a source in the White River National Forest to a confluence with the South Fork Piney River.

See also
 List of rivers of Colorado
 List of tributaries of the Colorado River

References

Rivers of Colorado
Rivers of Eagle County, Colorado
Tributaries of the Colorado River in Colorado